The Christel-Goltz Prize for voice has been awarded annually since 1992 until 2012 by the Foundation for the Promotion of the Semperoper. It was funded by soprano Christel Goltz.

The previous prizewinners were:
1993: Ute Selbig.
1994: Kerstin Witt
1995: Eva Kirchner.
1996: Jukka Rasilainen.
1997: Roland Wagenführer.
1998: Werner Güra
1999: Evelyn Herlitzius
2000: Camilla Nylund.
2001: Sophie Koch
2002: Klaus Florian Vogt
2003: Georg Zeppenfeld
2004: Markus Marquardt.
2005: Christa Mayer
2006: Wookyung Kim.  
2007: Anke Vondung
2008: Christoph Pohl 
2009: Markus Butter
2010: (no award)
2011: Carolina Ullrich
2012: Marjorie Owens.

References

External links 
 Website of the Semperoper Foundation

German music awards
Music in Dresden
Awards established in 1993
Goltz, Christel